Captain is a title, an appellative for the commanding officer of a military unit; the supreme leader of a navy ship, merchant ship, aeroplane, spacecraft, or other vessel; or the commander of a port, fire or police department, election precinct, etc. In militaries, the captain is typically at the level of an officer commanding a company or battalion of infantry, a ship, or a battery of artillery, or another distinct unit. The term also may be used as an informal or honorary title for persons in similar commanding roles.

Etymology
The word was Latinized as capetanus/catepan, and its meaning seems to have merged with that of the late Latin "capitaneus" (which derives from the classical Latin word "caput", meaning head). This hybridized term gave rise to the English language term captain and its equivalents in other languages (kapitány, Kapudan Pasha, Kobtan, etc.).

Occupations or roles
 Captain (armed forces), a commissioned officer rank corresponding to the field commander of a company of soldiers usually, or that of a battery of an artillery battalion (company second-in-command or specialist platoon commander in UK).
 Captain (naval), a commissioned officer rank in the navy, corresponding to the rank of Army colonel, Air force colonel.
 Captain (nautical), a licensed civilian mariner or person who is legally in command of a merchant  ship, a yacht or another type of vessel that may or may not be carrying passengers for hire; corresponds to the work condition of shipmaster or, as usually said, master.
 Captain (airlines), a licensed civilian airman or person who is legally in command of a civilian aircraft; corresponding to the work condition of pilot in command colloquially said PIC. 
 Fire captain, officer in a fire department.
 Police captain, officer in a police organization.
 Group Captain, a senior commissioned rank in many air forces.
 Captain of industry, business leader.
 Captain of the Port, harbour (UK) or Coast Guard (USA) post.
 Precinct captain, political party's representative at an election precinct.
 School captain, student elected or appointed to represent the school.
 Captain Regent, head of state of San Marino.
 Captain-major, colonial officer of a Portuguese possession.
 Captain-commandant, a Belgian military rank.
 Katepano, a senior Byzantine officer (and word from which "captain" derived).
 Kapudan Pasha
 Kapitan Cina
 Captal, a regional title in Southern France.

Military ranks

India 
 Captain (Indian Navy)
 Group captain (India)

Israel 
 Seren, an Israel Defense Forces officer rank whether Army, Air Force, or Navy

United Kingdom 
 Captain (Royal Navy), NATO OF-5 grade
 Captain (British Army and Royal Marines), NATO OF-2 grade
 Group Captain (Royal Air Force), NATO OF-5 grade

United States 
 Captain (United States)
 Captain (United States O-3) (US Air Force, Army, Marine Corps, or Space Force)
 Captain (United States O-6) (US Navy, US Public Health Service, or Coast Guard)

Canada 
 Captain (Canadian naval rank)
 Captain (Canadian army and air force)

Germany 
 Kapitän bzw. „Kapitän zur See“ (Deutsche Marine), Nato OF-5 grade

Generic 
 Captain (naval)
 Captain at sea
 Captain of sea and war
 other captain grades
 Ship-of-the-line captain
 Senior Captain
 Staff captain

Non-military / private ranks
 Airliner Captain

See also
 Captain (sports)
 Chief executive officer
 Capitaine (disambiguation)
 Capitan (disambiguation)
 El Capitan (disambiguation), Spanish for "The Captain"
 Kapitan (disambiguation)

References

Military command staff occupations
Military ranks
Naval ranks
Police ranks
Former disambiguation pages converted to set index articles